"Three's a Crowd" is a song written by Nathaniel Calhoun and recorded by American R&B/soul singer Milira. It was released on July 3, 1992, as a single from her 1992 album, Back Again!!!, and the second and final single from the album.

Track listing
US CD Single

Charts

Cover version
R&B/soul singer Miki Howard recorded the song for her 1997 album, Can't Count Me Out. LeMel Humes produced Howard's version of the song as well.

References

 

1992 singles
Milira songs
Miki Howard songs
Song recordings produced by LeMel Humes
Motown singles
1992 songs